In My Country may refer to:

 In My Country (2004 film), a South African drama film 
 In My Country (2017 film), a Nigerian film